Kamil Saidov (born 25 January 1989) is a Tajikistani footballer who plays for Barki Tajik. He is a member of the Tajikistan national football team in the 2010 FIFA World Cup qualification campaign.

Career
In January 2014, Saidov joined FC Istiklol, going on to make 15 league appearances and scoring 7 goals, before leaving the club in December of the same year.

On 14 August 2016, Saidov scored five-goals for Khosilot Farkhor in their 6–0 victory over Khayr Vahdat.

Career statistics

International

Statistics accurate as of match played 5 October 2016

International goals

Honours

Club
Regar-TadAZ
AFC President's Cup (1): 2009
Istiklol
Tajikistan Higher League (1): 2014
Tajikistan Cup (1): 2014
Tajik Supercup (1): 2014

International
Tajikistan
AFC Challenge Cup (1): 2006

Notes

References

External links

1989 births
Living people
Tajikistani footballers
Tajikistan international footballers
FC Istiklol players
Footballers at the 2006 Asian Games
Association football forwards
Asian Games competitors for Tajikistan
Tajikistan Higher League players